The Uniting Church in Australia (UCA) was founded on 22 June 1977, when most congregations of the Methodist Church of Australasia, about two-thirds of the Presbyterian Church of Australia and almost all the churches of the Congregational Union of Australia united under the Basis of Union. According to the church, it had 243,000 members in 2018. The UCA is Australia's third-largest Christian denomination, behind the Catholic and the Anglican Churches. There are around 2,000 UCA congregations, and 2001 National Church Life Survey (NCLS) research indicated that average weekly attendance was about 10 per cent of census figures.

The UCA is one of Australia's largest non-government provider of community and health services. Its service network consists of over 400 agencies, institutions, and parish missions, with its areas of service including aged care, hospitals, children, youth and family, disability, employment, emergency relief, drug and alcohol abuse, youth homelessness and suicide. Affiliated agencies include UCA's community and health-service provider network, affiliated schools, the Uniting Aboriginal and Islander Christian Congress, Frontier Services and UnitingWorld.

Organisation

The UCA is a national, unincorporated association of councils, each of which has responsibility for functions in the church. The councils are congregations (local), presbyteries (regional), synods (state) and an
assembly (national).

The membership of each council is established by the constitution. Each council includes Women and Men, lay and ordained. The offices of president of assembly, moderator of synod (who chair these councils) and other offices are open to all UCA members.

The UCA is a non-episcopal church, with no bishops. Leadership and pastoral roles are nominally performed by presbyteries, but in reality by individuals.

Assembly
The UCA assembly meets every three years, and is chaired by the president. The 14th Assembly met in Perth from 12 to 18 July 2015. The 15th Assembly, hosted by the Synod of Victoria and Tasmania in Box Hill, met in July 2018. Assembly business between meetings is conducted by the Assembly Standing Committee, which meets three times per year (usually in March, July and November). Membership is drawn from throughout Australia, with 18 members elected at each assembly.

President

The current president is Reverend Sharon Hollis since she was installed as president in the online meeting of the 16th Assembly on 17 July 2021. She replaced Deidre Palmer, who had succeeded Stuart McMillan at the start of the 15th Assembly on 8 July 2018. Palmer was the second woman in the role, following Jill Tabart (1994-1997). Palmer was the moderator of the Presbytery and Synod of South Australia from November 2013 to November 2016. Hollis was moderator of the Synod of Victoria and Tasmania at the time of her election in 2018 as the president-elect and became president at the beginning of the sixteenth assembly, which was to be held in Queensland in 2021. As a result of the COVID-19 pandemic, the meeting was moved to a shorter, online form.

Synods
Synods are UCA councils which roughly correspond to state boundaries. Each synod meets about once per year, with a standing committee to represent it between sessions. Synod responsibilities include the promotion and encouragement of the church's mission, theological and ministerial education, and overseeing property matters. There are six synods:
 Synod of New South Wales and the ACT (formerly the NSW Synod)
 Synod of Queensland
 Synod of South Australia
 Synod of Western Australia
 Synod of Victoria and Tasmania
 The Northern Synod, which includes the Northern Territory, north-west Western Australia and northern South Australia.

Presbyteries
Each synod generally consists of a number of presbyteries. Western Australia has a unitary presbytery-synod model. South Australia also had a single presbytery and synod for 15 years, until 2019. These large presbyteries enable groups of congregations to work together, based on geographic location or similar interests or characteristics. Selection of ministerial candidates and the placement of ministers are decided at the presbytery level.

Congregations
There are about 2,000 UCA congregations, with 243,000 members and adherents. Congregations range in size from a dozen to hundreds of members. They are the local church, the setting for regular worship (generally on Sundays). Many churches also conduct worship services at other times, such as a monthly weekday service, a late-night service for day-shift workers, a "cafe church", or Friday- or Saturday-evening services.

A Meeting of the Congregation must be held at least twice each year. The meetings typically consider and approve the budget, local policy matters, property matters (ratified by the presbytery and synod) and the "call" (employment) of a new minister or other staff.

Congregations manage themselves through a council. All elders are members, as are ministers with pastoral responsibility for the congregation; there may also be other members. The council meets regularly, and is responsible for approving worship times and other matters.

Some united congregations exist. The UCA has joined with other churches, such as the Baptist Union and the Churches of Christ, in some locations. There are also cooperative arrangements where supplying ministry to congregations is impossible, particularly in remote areas. This includes arrangements with the Anglican Church, where ministry and (sometimes) property resources are shared.

Faith communities are less structured than congregations. They are groups of people who gather together for worship, witness or service and choose to be recognised by the presbytery. Local churches are sometimes also used by congregations of other denominations; for example, a Tongan Seventh-day Adventist congregation may make arrangements to meet in the building on a Saturday. The UCA is committed to inclusivity, and there are a number of multicultural ministry (MCM) arrangements in which Korean, Tongan and other groups form congregations of the church.

Co-operating congregations
Co-operating congregations, typically in rural areas, have several denominations worshiping as one congregation and rotate the denomination appointing its next minister. They are known as union churches in some places, with several denominations using the building at different times.

Frontier Services
A Frontier Services ministry is available to residents of the outback, with ministers and pastors visiting families by air or four-wheel drive vehicles. Visits are normally arranged in advance so adjacent families can travel for significant events, such as baptisms. These "padres" are based in a major town or city, and the local synod is normally their organisational and funding body.

Uniting Aboriginal and Islander Christian Congress
The Uniting Aboriginal and Islander Christian Congress (UAICC, sometimes known simply as the Congress), is constitutionally recognised  as having responsibility for oversight of church ministry to the Aboriginal and Torres Strait Islander people:

A Synod may at the request of a Regional Committee of the Uniting Aboriginal and Islander Christian Congress prescribe that the Regional Committee may have and exercise all or specific rights, powers, duties and responsibilities of a Presbytery under this Constitution and the Regulations (including ordination and other rights, powers and responsibilities relating to Ministers) for the purpose of fulfilling any responsibility of the Regional Committee for Uniting Church work with Aboriginal and Islander people
within the bounds of the Synod.

Agencies

UnitingCare Australia, one of the country's largest providers of social care, is its largest operator of aged-care facilities. Other activities include shelters and emergency housing for men, women and children; family-relationships support; disability services, and food kitchens.

Education
The UCA provides theological training through a number of theological colleges:
New South Wales: United Theological College, Parramatta a member of the School of Theology at Charles Sturt University.
Queensland: Trinity College (with Australian Catholic University)
South Australia: Uniting College for Leadership and Theology, Adelaide College of Divinity 
Victoria and Tasmania: Pilgrim Theological College, part of the University of Divinity
Western Australia: Perth Theological Hall

Training generally takes five years, and includes supervised practical experience.

Youth
The National Christian Youth Convention is a national UCA activity during school and university holidays, every two or three years in a different city. NCYC 2007, "Agents of Change", was held in Perth. The 2009 "Converge" was held in Melbourne. NCYC 2011 was held from 29 December 2010 to 4 January 2011 at the Southport School on Queensland's Gold Coast. Yuróra NCYC 2014 was held in North Parramatta, Sydney from 7 to 10 January 2014. Yuróra NCYC 2017, "Uniting Culture", was also held in Sydney in January 2017.

International aid
UnitingWorld is the church's international-aid agency. It receives funding from the government of Australia to implement development and poverty-alleviation programs in the Pacific, Asia and Africa. UnitingWorld works in partnership with 18 overseas denominations to support over 180,000 people annually through sustainable community development projects.

Ministry
The role of the laity is valued in the UCA, which recognises that ministry is a function of the entire church. However, "specified ministries" are defined. Of these, the roles of elder and pastor are open to lay members. The church has two orders of ordained ministry: minister and deacon.

When it is not possible (or desirable) to have an ordained minister, a lay preacher or lay ministry team may act in their place (similar to a Methodist local preacher). Lay preachers are required to participate in training and examinations conducted by each synod, and must be approved by the presbytery.

Culture

The UCA was one of the first Australian churches to grant self-determination to its indigenous members through the Uniting Aboriginal and Islander Christian Congress. Partnerships exist with South Pacific and Asian churches, especially those which share a Congregational, Presbyterian or Methodist heritage. An increasing number of ethnic churches worship in their own languages as well as in English. Five to seven per cent of the membership worship in languages other than English, including Aboriginal languages.

The UCA advocates for social justice. It has taken stances on issues such as native title for indigenous people; the environment; apartheid; refugee status, and safe injection facilities for drug users. The church is similar to other united and uniting churches, which maintain a cultural identity in their own country and practise ecumenical fellowship with other Christian denominations worldwide. Between 1991 and 2013, UCA attendance declined by 41 per cent. In 2013, about 97,200 people attended weekly worship services throughout Australia.

Liturgy
The church is liturgically varied. Practices range from experimental liturgies, informal worship reminiscent of the Jesus movement to conventional Reformed services. Music also varies from traditional and contemporary hymns in the Australian Hymn Book and Together in Song, through Hillsong and contemporary Christian music to hard alternative and metal.

Liturgical dress in the UCA is generally lenient, and is optional for ministers and other leaders of worship. When liturgical dress is worn, it most commonly consists of a white alb and a stole (for ministers and deacons) or scarf (for lay preachers). The colour of the scarf or stole is often related to the liturgical calendar, such as purple for Lent or red for Pentecost.

Decision-making

Since 1997, most councils and agencies have used the consensus decision-making procedures outlined in the church's Manual for Meetings. The procedures may use orange ("support") and blue ("do not support") cards, which may also be displayed times other than voting.

Theology
The UCA's theological range is broad, reflecting its Methodist, Presbyterian and Congregational origins and its commitment to ecumenism. Its theology may be described as mainline Protestantism, with a commitment to social justice. The church's perspectives are evangelical, left (or progressive), and liberal. Morality, faith, and (in particular) sexuality have been debated. Concerns focus on biblical understanding and accommodation to the broad culture.

Uniting Network Australia is "the national network for lesbian, gay, bisexual, intersex and transgender people, their families, friends and supporters within the Uniting Church in Australia." The establishment of Evangelical Members within the Uniting Church in Australia (EMU), the Reforming Alliance and their merger with the Assembly of Confessing Congregations (ACC) illustrate conservative opposition to the ordination of gay and lesbian candidates and the influence of the Confessing Movement (not to be confused with the anti-Nazi Confessing Church).

Homosexuality

Issues debated since early in UCA history are the role of gay and lesbian people in the church, their possibility of being ordained and the blessing of same-sex unions. The church permits local presbyteries to ordain gay and lesbian ministers, and extends the local option to marriage; a minister may bless a same-sex marriage.

The fairly broad consensus has been that a person's sexual orientation should not be a bar to attendance, membership or participation in the church. More controversial has been the issue of sexual activity by gay and lesbian people and the sexual behaviour of ordination candidates. In 2003, the church voted to allow local presbyteries to decide whether to ordain gay and lesbian people as ministers. Ministers were permitted to bless same-sex couples entering civil unions even before same-sex marriage was legalised in Australia in late 2017. In July 2018, the national assembly approved the creation of marriage rites for same-sex couples.

Since 1997, some ministers living in same-sex relationships have come out without their ordination (or ministry) being challenged. In 2011, the church approved the blessing of same-sex unions. Seven years later it allowed local congregations and ministers to decide whether to perform same-sex marriages, and ministers may now do so.

In March 2021, the UCA became the first mainstream Australian church to induct a transgender minister, when Jo Inkpin was installed at Pitt Street Uniting Church in Sydney.

Theologians
 Alan Walker
 James Haire
 Bill Loader
 Wesley Wildman
 Benjamin Myers

Assemblies

See also

 Christian Conference of Asia
 Confessing Movement
 Congregational Federation of Australia
 Fellowship of Congregational Churches
 Homosexuality and Christianity
 Presbyterian Church of Australia
 Progressive Christianity
 Rupert Grove
 United and uniting churches
 United Church of Canada
 Wesleyan Methodist Church of Australia
 World Alliance of Reformed Churches
 World Methodist Council

References

External links

Official websites
National Assembly website
UnitingWorld website
UnitingCare Australia
Relations with Other Faiths website
Multicultural and Cross Cultural website
UnitingJustice website
Journey magazine website
Assembly of Confessing Congregations within the UCA

Other websites

 
United and uniting churches
Methodist denominations
Presbyterian denominations in Australia
Congregationalist denominations
Members of the World Communion of Reformed Churches
Members of the World Council of Churches
Christian organizations established in 1977
1977 establishments in Australia
Christian denominations in Australia